odolo (also Romanized as 'odolo) is a village in gog Tappeh Rural District, in the Central District of Bileh Savar County, Ardabil Province, Iran. At the 2006 census, its population was 830, in 156 families.

References 

Towns and villages in Bileh Savar County